Ben Toma is an American politician serving as a member of the Arizona House of Representatives for the 27th district. Elected in November 2016, he assumed office in January 2017. He was selected to be Speaker of the House in 2022, taking office in 2023. From 2021 to 2023, Toma served as majority leader of the Arizona House.

Career
Toma is a real estate broker.
He was appointed on a 5–1 vote to serve as a member of the Peoria, Arizona, city council in June 2014, when Cathy Carlat resigned to run for mayor. However, Toma was defeated in the special election in 2014. He lost again in 2016.

Arizona House of Representatives 
In April 2017, the Maricopa County Board of Supervisors appointed Toma to fill a vacant seat in the Arizona House of Representatives representing the 22nd legislative district, to replaced Phil Lovas, who resigned to accept a federal appointment with the Small Business Administration. The Board selected Toma from a list of three nominees put forward by the Republican precinct committeemen. The district includes parts of Peoria, Glendale, Surprise and Sun City West. Toma took his seat in the final days of 53rd Legislature, and was subsequently elected to a full term in the 2018 elections.

In February 2019, Arizona Governor Doug Ducey vetoed a plan, supported by state legislators of his own Republican Party, for across-the-board cuts in the individual state income tax. Toma, as chair of the House Ways and Means Committee, was an outspoken supporter of the tax-cut plan and an avowed opponent of tax increases. Ducey, Toma and other Arizona Republicans subsequently agreed upon a $11.9 billion state budget deal that included $386 million in offsets to tax hikes, angering some Arizona schoolteachers who were supporting higher taxes to increase funding for public schools. Toma had previously voted for historic salary increases for Arizona K-12 teachers. In 2021, Toma, as House majority leader, was the key architect of the largest tax cut package in state history, as well as a separate bill that shielded high-earners from a 3.5% tax surcharge for education that had been approved by voters in the November 2020 election (Proposition 208). The package, brokered between Ducey and Republican legislators, passed on a party-line vote. Toma initially proposed a flat tax, but was unable to garner enough votes to pass it after a single House Republican joined with all Democrats in opposing it. Toma defended the plan's focus on tax cuts for high-earning taxpayers, contending that "They're the ones that tend to make the jobs and create the economic conditions that lead to economic improvement for the entire state."

In 2022, Toma wrote and led passage of the nation's largest school choice expansion. Corey DeAngelis, a senior fellow at the American Federation for Children, called the bill’s passage “the biggest school choice victory in U.S. history... Families will be able to take state funded education dollars to any education provider that meets their student’s curricular needs whether that be public, private, or a home-based educational option."

References

External links
 

|-

21st-century American politicians
Living people
Place of birth missing (living people)
Republican Party members of the Arizona House of Representatives
Speakers of the Arizona House of Representatives
Year of birth missing (living people)